Vladislav Nehasil (born 23 March 1947) is a Czech gymnast. He competed at the 1972 Summer Olympics and the 1976 Summer Olympics.

References

1947 births
Living people
Czech male artistic gymnasts
Olympic gymnasts of Czechoslovakia
Gymnasts at the 1972 Summer Olympics
Gymnasts at the 1976 Summer Olympics
Sportspeople from Ústí nad Labem